Zheng Yiming (born 12 January 1997) is a Chinese footballer currently playing as a defender for Beijing Guoan.

Club career
Zheng Yiming would make his senior debut at Stabæk II in a league game against Elverum on 7 May 2018 that ended in a 3-3 draw.

Career statistics

References

External links

1997 births
Living people
Chinese footballers
Chinese expatriate footballers
Association football defenders
Norwegian Second Division players
Chinese Super League players
Stabæk Fotball players
Beijing Guoan F.C. players
Expatriate footballers in Norway